Thomas Davis (October 8, 1817 – August 30, 1908) was a member of the Wisconsin State Assembly from 1865 to 1866. He was born in Enosburgh, Vermont and resided in Millard and Sugar Creek, Wisconsin.

References

External links

People from Sugar Creek, Wisconsin
1817 births
1908 deaths
Members of the Wisconsin State Assembly
19th-century American politicians